Nihonkai Telecasting Co., Ltd. (日本海テレビジョン放送株式会社, NKT) is a Japanese TV station broadcast in Tottori Prefecture and Shimane Prefecture.  NKT is a TV station of Nippon News Network (NNN) and Nippon Television Network System (NNS).

Channel
Nihonkai Television
Tottori Prefecture
 Tottori JOJX-TV　1Ch
 Koge 44Ch(US45)
 Kawahara 5Ch(US7)
 Chizu 10Ch(US12)
 Hino 8Ch(US10) etc...
Shimane Prefecture
 Matsue 30Ch(US31)
 Hamada 54Ch(US54)
 Ota 61Ch(US62)
 Masuda 40Ch(US41)
 Gotsu 40Ch(US41)
 Okinoshima 37Ch(US38)
 Mitoya 61Ch(US62)
 Misumi 42Ch(US43) etc...

External links
Official website of Nihonkai TV (Japanese)

Television stations in Japan
Nippon News Network
Television channels and stations established in 1959
Companies based in Tottori Prefecture